L'oro di Roma (internationally released as Gold of Rome) is a 1961 Italian war - drama film directed by Carlo Lizzani. The film is based on actual events surrounding the Nazi's raid of Rome's Jewish ghetto in October 1943.

Cast 
Gérard Blain: Davide
Anna Maria Ferrero: Giulia 
Jean Sorel: Massimo
Andrea Checchi: Ortona 
Paola Borboni: Rosa
Umberto Raho: Beniamino
Filippo Scelzo: Ludovico

References

External links

1961 films
1960s war drama films
Italian war drama films
1960s Italian-language films
World War II films based on actual events
Films set in Rome
Films directed by Carlo Lizzani
Holocaust films
Films scored by Giovanni Fusco
1961 drama films
Italian World War II films
1960s Italian films